Posticobia norfolkensis is an extinct species of freshwater snail, an aquatic gastropod mollusk in the family Hydrobiidae, the mud snails. This species was endemic to Norfolk Island.

References

N
Extinct gastropods
Extinct animals of Oceania
Gastropods of Norfolk Island
Molluscs of Oceania
Molluscs of the Pacific Ocean
Gastropods described in 1900
Taxonomy articles created by Polbot